P.O.P (Abbreviation for: Puzzle Of POP; stylized as POP) is a South Korean girl group formed by DWM Entertainment in 2017. The group debuted on July 26, 2017, with the Puzzle Of POP.

History

2017: Debut with Puzzle of POP and Yeonha's Hiatus 
On August 1, it was revealed by DWM Entertainment that Yeonha would be taking a break from group activities due to her busy schedule and was in a poor condition. Yeonha, at the time, was being tested for myasthenia gravis (a neuromuscular disease).

On October 24, it was revealed by Ministry Health officials that Yeonha had terminated her contract with DWM Entertainment due to her health. P.O.P had been preparing for their comeback after wrapping up their debut activities. The group will continue as a five membered group.

Members

Former
Ahyung (Hangul: 아형)
Miso (미소)
Seol (설)
Haeri (해리)
Yeonjoo (연주)
Yeonha (연하)

Discography

Extended plays

Singles

References

2017 establishments in South Korea
Musical groups established in 2017
Musical groups from Seoul
South Korean girl groups
South Korean dance music groups
South Korean pop music groups